Magnar Solberg (born 4 February 1937) is a former Norwegian biathlete and police officer. He won a gold medal in the 20 km at the 1968 and 1972 Winter Olympics; his 4 × 7.5 km relay teams placed second in 1968 and fourth in 1972. In 1968 he was awarded Morgenbladets Gullmedalje, and in 1972 served as the Olympic flag bearer for Norway at the opening ceremony. He was one of the 16 former Norwegian athletes selected to bring in the Olympic Flag at the Opening Ceremony of the 1994 Winter Olympics.

After retiring from competitions Solberg became a police officer. He was one of the officers responsible for the miscarriage of justice against Fritz Moen, by adjusting a murder victims time of death in order to dismiss Moens alibi. He later admitted to wrongdoing, retired from the police force, and worked in the insurance industry.

Biathlon results
All results are sourced from the International Biathlon Union.

Olympic Games
3 medals (2 gold, 1 silver)

World Championships
5 medals (3 silver, 2 bronze)

*During Olympic seasons competitions are only held for those events not included in the Olympic program.

References

External links

1937 births
Living people
Norwegian male biathletes
Biathletes at the 1968 Winter Olympics
Biathletes at the 1972 Winter Olympics
Olympic biathletes of Norway
Medalists at the 1968 Winter Olympics
Medalists at the 1972 Winter Olympics
Olympic medalists in biathlon
Olympic silver medalists for Norway
Olympic gold medalists for Norway
Biathlon World Championships medalists